Sankt Pölten (Central Bavarian: St. Pödn), mostly abbreviated to the official name St. Pölten, is the capital and largest city of the State of Lower Austria in northeast Austria, with 55,538 inhabitants as of 1 January 2020. St. Pölten is a city with its own statute (or Statutarstadt) and therefore it is both a municipality and a district in the Mostviertel.

Geography
The city lies on the Traisen river and is located north of the Alps and south of the Wachau. It is part of the Mostviertel, the southwest region of Lower Austria.

Subdistricts

St Pölten is divided into the following subdistricts: Altmannsdorf, Dörfl at Ochsenburg, Eggendorf, Ganzendorf, Hafing, Harland, Hart, Kreisberg, Matzersdorf, Mühlgang, Nadelbach, Oberradlberg, Oberwagram, Oberzwischenbrunn, Ochsenburg, Pengersdorf, Pottenbrunn, Pummersdorf, Ragelsdorf, Ratzersdorf at the Traisen, Reitzersdorf, Schwadorf, Spratzern, St Georgen on the Steinfelde, St Pölten, Stattersdorf, Steinfeld, Teufelhof, Unterradlberg, Unterwagram, Unterzwischenbrunn, Viehofen, Völtendorf, Waitzendorf, Wasserburg, Weitern, Wetzersdorf, Windpassing, Witzendorf, Wolfenberg, Wörth and Zwerndorf.

Transport 
The city's main railway station, St. Pölten Hauptbahnhof, is located directly on the West railway of the ÖBB and is also the terminus of the Leobersdorfer Railway, the Mariazellerbahn, the regional railway to Tulln and the regional railway to Krems. It is at the intersection of the Western Motorway A1 and the Kremser Speedway S33, and is traversed by the Vienna Road B1. St Pölten is a junction of the Wieselbus bus lines, which provides radial connections between the capital and the different regions of Lower Austria.

In the city
Between 1911 and 1976, a tramline operated in St Pölten. Today, a network of eleven bus lines operates at regular intervals within the city. Every summer, a free tourist train in the city centre connects the ancient parts of the city with the government district.

Climate

History 

The oldest part of the city is built on the site of the ancient Roman city of Aelium Cetium that existed between the 2nd and the 4th century. In the year 799, it was called Treisma. St Pölten did not become a town until 1050 and officially became a city in 1169. Until 1494 St Pölten was part of the diocese of Passau, and then became the property of the state. A Benedictine monastery was founded in 791. In 1081 it hosted the Augustinian Chorherren and in 1784 their Kollegiatsstift closed. Since 1785, this building has hosted the cathedral of St Pölten. The city replaced Vienna as the capital of Lower Austria with a resolution by the Lower Austrian parliament on 10 July 1986. The Lower Austrian government has been hosted in St Pölten since 1997.

The name St Pölten is derived from Hippolytus of Rome. The city was renamed to Sankt Hippolyt, then St Polyt and finally St Pölten.

Politics

Municipal council 
The municipal council consists of 42 members and since the municipal elections in 2016 it consists of the following parties:
 26 Social Democratic Party of Austria (SPÖ) – the mayor and the first vice mayor
 9 Austrian People's Party (ÖVP) – the second vice mayor
 6 FPÖ
 1 The Greens – The Green Alternative

City's senate 

The city's senate consists of 11 members:
 SPÖ: Martin Fuhs, Mag. Renate Gamsjäger, Engineer Franz Gunacker, Robert Laimer, Wolfgang Nowak, Mag. Johann Rankl, Mag. Ingrid Heihs
 ÖVP: Alfred Neuhauser, Josef Fraberger
 FPÖ
 Greens: Silvia Buschenreiter

Mayor 
On 9 July 2004 the municipal council elected the former senator for culture Mag. Matthias Stadler (SPÖ) as the new mayor of St Pölten. The first vice mayor is Susanne Kysela (SPÖ); the second vice mayor is Johannes Sassmann (ÖVP).

Coat of arms, colours and seals 
The arms' blazon is silver and azure; on the right a fess gules, on the left a wolf rampant silver langued gules and armed Or.

The colours of the city are red and yellow. The seal of the city contains its coat of arms surrounded by the text Landeshauptstadt St. Pölten. The administration's seal of the magistrate also contains the city's coat of arms with the text Magistrat der Stadt St. Pölten.

Economy
As of 15 May 2001, 40,041 people worked in 2,711 companies in the city. 23 of those companies are large-scale enterprises with more than 200 employees each.

Media 
Several media companies are based in St Pölten. These are "@cetera", a literary-cultural magazine; "City-Flyer", an online magazine describing the cultural offerings of the city, which is published on paper monthly; "Campus Radio", a radio station from the University of Applied Sciences; "HiT FM", a radio station broadcasting in Lower Austria; "LetHereBeRock", an online youth magazine about the alternative rock scene; NÖN, a Lower Austrian newspaper; the Austrian Broadcasting Corporation for Lower Austria; and the local television channel "P3tv".

Large-scale enterprises 
The largest companies based in St Pölten are the furniture producer Leiner, the paper manufacturer Salzer, and the family owned engineering conglomerate Voith.

Public facilities

Educational facilities 
 Bundesgymnasium and Bundesrealgymnasium St. Pölten (public gymnasium)
 Public educational facility for kindergarten pedagogy and social pedagogy
 Public economics school and economics academy
 Bundesreal- and Bundesoberstufenrealgymnasium (BORG) Schulring (public high-level gymnasium)
 St. Pölten University of Applied Sciences (fields: computer simulation, media management, social work, telecommunication and media)
 Public higher educational facility for professions in economics and school for social professions
 Public higher technical educational facility and laboratory (fields: EDP and organisation, electronics, electrical engineering, machine engineering, economic engineering) with university of applied sciences for machine construction
 New Design University (interior architecture and graphics design)
 Lower Austrian state academy
 Philosophical-theological university
 Folk high school
 Lower Austrian institute for promotion of economy development (WIFI)

Leisure and sports sites 

Swimming is available at Aquacity (indoor swimming pool), the St. Pölten outdoor swimming pool and Ratzersdorf Lake (a bathing pond where a nudist beach, beach volleyball, and miniature golf are available). For fitness training there is the City-Treff - Pueblo, the Lifeline, the Reebok  and the Seepark. In addition, the city has:
 American Football Club - St. Pölten Invaders
 Badminton Club
 Golf club St. Pölten
 Skittles at the leisure park Megafun
 Miniature golf at the Tennis-Allround Center
 Model aircraft airport of the BSV VOITH
 Riding club St. Pölten-Wagram
 Shooting range of the private Schützenkompagnie
 Skatepark
 Gliding club St. Pölten

St Pölten hosts a primary base of the Lower Austrian state sports school.

Tennis 
Every year in the third week of May the ATP tournament takes place in St Pölten. There are multiple local tennis stadiums, including the Arena im Aufeld, the tennis centre Allround, the tennis courts by the local ice sport association 1872, the courts in St. Georgen, the courts at the Ratzersdorfer Pond, the courts in the Lower Austrian state sports school and the courts of the leisure park Megafun.

International relations

Twin towns – Sister cities

St Pölten is twinned with the following cities:
  Altoona, Pennsylvania, USA
  Brno, Czech Republic 
  Clichy, Hauts-de-Seine, Île-de-France, France
  Heidenheim, Baden-Württemberg, Germany
  Kurashiki, Japan
  Nyíregyháza, Hungary
  Wuhan, China

Culture and objects of interest

Theatres 
 Lower Austrian state theatre
 Bühne im Hof
 Festspielhaus St. Pölten

Museums 
 Diocese museum St. Pölten
 Museum im Hof
 Lower Austrian state museum
 Lower Austrian documentation institute for modern art
 Private museum "Wilhelmsburger ornament and utensil dishes"
 City museum St. Pölten

Others 
 Repertory theatre Cinema Paradiso
 Former synagogue
 Klangturm (tower), the city's landmark
 Stadtsäle (public event hall)
 Youth culture hall frei.raum
 VAZ (Veranstaltungszentrum, event-centre)
 Drunter & Drüber (≈"haywire"; "higgledy-piggledy"; "topsy-turvy"), a pub in the inner city
 Tonkünstler Orchestra
 Business Center Niederösterreich
 Apotheke zum goldenen Löwen (pharmacy since 1545), oldest shop in town, famous baroque facing

Regular events 
 ATP tennis tournament
 Cinema at the cathedral (Film am Dom)
 Capital city festival
 International culture and film festival
 Parliament festival
 St Pölten festival weeks "Klangweile"
 St Pölten Höfefest
 FM4 Frequency Festival
 Pro Golf Tour tournament

Notable people 

 Martin Fiala, composer
 Jörg Demus, (1928–2019), pianist
 Walter Graf (1903–1982), musicologist
 Alfred Gusenbauer, (born 1960), politician (SPÖ) and former chancellor of Austria
 Andreas Lattner, computer scientist
 Erwin Leder, (born 1951), actor (Das Boot, Underworld)
 Karl Österreicher (1923–1995), conductor, music educator
 Julius Raab, (1891-1964), conservative politician, chancellor of Austria 1953-1961
 Mario Ranieri, DJ and producer
 Bernhard Wicki, actor and director
 Lolita, singer and actress
 Dom Manuel, Portuguese Infant, younger brother of King John V, lived in St Pölten for some time in the 1730s
 Oliver Stummvoll, model
 The Clairvoyants, magician-mentalist duo
 Heinrich Maier (very important resistance fighter against Nazi Germany), attended gymnasium school here

Literature 
 Klaus Nüchtern: Kleines Gulasch in St. Pölten (German): 
 Thomas Karl: St. Pölten - Ein Wandel durch die Zeit (German): 
 Otto Kapfinger, Michaela Steiner: St. Pölten neu (German):

References

External links

  
 

 
Austrian state capitals
Cities and towns in Lower Austria